Lieutenant General Sir William Raoul Rollo,  (born August 1955) is a former senior British Army officer.

Military career
Rollo was commissioned as a second lieutenant (on probation) in the Territorial and Army Volunteer Reserve on 10 March 1977. He was then granted a short service commission, as a University Candidate, in the Blues and Royals on 4 September that year. His commission was subsequently confirmed and he was promoted to lieutenant, with seniority from 4 September 1975. He was promoted to captain on 4 March 1980, and to major on 30 September 1987. On 30 June 1992, he was promoted to lieutenant colonel. In 1994 he became Commanding Officer of the Household Cavalry Regiment and was deployed to Bosnia as part of the United Nations Protection Force.

Rollo was promoted to colonel on 30 June 1996. In 1998 he was appointed commander of the 4th Armoured Brigade, which was deployed to Macedonia and then to Kosovo.

Rollo was promoted to brigadier on 31 December 1998, with seniority from 30 June. He was appointed a Commander of the Order of the British Empire in the 2000 New Year Honours, and made aide-de-camp to Queen Elizabeth II on 1 November 2000, relinquishing the appointment on 28 June 2002.

Rollo was deployed as General Officer Commanding Multi-National Division (South East), Iraq in July 2004 and became Assistant Chief of the General Staff in January 2005. In July 2007 he was deployed again – this time as Senior British Military Representative and Deputy Commanding General, Multinational Force, Iraq.

Rollo was appointed Adjutant-General to the Forces in March 2008. Then, in December 2009, he was made Commander Force Development and Training, and in 2010 he was made Deputy Chief of the Defence Staff (Personnel and Training). He was appointed a Knight Commander of the Order of the Bath in the 2010 New Year Honours.

References

|-

|-

|-
 

|-
 

|-

1955 births
Living people
British Army lieutenant generals
Blues and Royals officers
Commanders of the Order of the British Empire
British Army personnel of the Iraq War
Knights Commander of the Order of the Bath
Military personnel from London